Gordon Stewart (16 June 1906 – 21 October 1984) was an Australian cricketer. He played ten first-class matches for New South Wales between 1930/31 and 1932/33.

See also
 List of New South Wales representative cricketers

References

External links
 

1906 births
1984 deaths
Australian cricketers
New South Wales cricketers
Cricketers from Sydney